Vazgen Safaryants (born  22 October 1984 in Ordzhonikidze) is a Belarusian amateur boxer of Armenian origin best known for placing third at the 2006 European Amateur Boxing Championships.

References

External links
 

1984 births
Sportspeople from Vladikavkaz
Living people
Belarusian people of Armenian descent
Boxers at the 2012 Summer Olympics
Olympic boxers of Belarus
Belarusian male boxers
Boxers at the 2015 European Games
European Games competitors for Belarus
Boxers at the 2019 European Games
Lightweight boxers
21st-century Belarusian people